A namesake is a person or thing that has the same name as another or that is named after another.

Namesake may also refer to:

 "The Namesake" (short story), by Willa Cather
 The Namesake, children's book by C. Walter Hodges
 The Namesake (novel), novel by Jhumpa Lahiri
 The Namesake (film), a 2006 drama film, based on the novel
 Namesake (album), a 1987 album by Dennis González
 The Namesake (NCIS), an episode of the American police procedural series
 Namesake (webcomic), a fantasy webcomic running since 2010